Wasco County is one of the 36 counties in the U.S. state of Oregon. As of the 2020 census, the population was 25,213.  Its county seat is The Dalles. The county is named for a local tribe of Native Americans, the Wasco, a Chinook tribe who live on the south side of the Columbia River. It is near the Washington state line. Wasco County comprises The Dalles Micropolitan Statistical Area.

History
Celilo Falls on the Columbia River served as a gathering place and major trading center for the local Native Americans, including the Wasco, Paiute, and Warm Springs tribes, for thousands of years. These rapids came to be named Les Grandes Dalles de la Columbia or "The Great Falls of the Columbia" by the French Canadian fur traders.

The Dalles initially served as a way station on the Oregon Trail as it approached the Willamette Valley. The construction of the Barlow Road over the Cascade Range in 1845, and the Donation Land Claim Act of 1850 encouraged families to settle in the area. Over the following years, Wasco County was a major transportation hub for both river and inland traffic.

The Oregon Territorial Legislature created Wasco County on January 11, 1854, from the parts of Clackamas, Lane, Linn and Marion counties, that were east of the Cascade Range.  At the time of its creation, it was the largest county in the United States, consisting of  that stretched clear to the Rocky Mountains. Its northern border was the Washington Territory line (the Columbia River). When Dakota Territory (including present-day Wyoming) was created in 1861, Idaho Territory in 1863, and Montana Territory in 1864, the parts of Wasco County east of the present Oregon boundaries were ceded to those territories. Other Oregon counties were split away, and Wasco was reduced to its current size.

The Dalles was designated the county seat with the creation of the county, and has been its only location.

The river traffic on the Columbia River was profoundly affected in 1935 by the building of Bonneville Dam in Multnomah County and by The Dalles Dam in 1957 in Wasco County (which submerged Celilo Falls).

Wasco County attracted international attention in the 1980s, when Bhagwan Shree Rajneesh established the Rajneeshpuram movement at a marginal ranch originally called "The Big Muddy". Disagreements with the county government and other residents over zoning rules and building codes escalated, while his followers, known as Rajneeshees, settled en bloc in Antelope, Oregon and were able to elect a majority of the town councillors. When the Rajneeshees subsequently recruited homeless people from across the United States to settle at Rajneeshpuram, it was widely seen as an attempt to use the ballot box to seize control of the county. An intentional outbreak of salmonella in salad bars at ten restaurants in The Dalles in 1984 was traced to the acts of Rajneeshees.

Rajneesh was arrested as he was fleeing the U.S. in 1985 and he was subsequently indicted along with seven followers for immigration crimes by a federal grand jury. A separate grand jury in Wasco County charged three Rajneeshees of attempted murder, while Rajneesh entered an Alford plea and was given a suspended sentence on condition that he leave the country.

The former Rajneesh ranch is now known as "Washington Family Ranch".  It is owned and operated by Young Life Ministries, a Christian organization providing camp services for youth.

Geography

The northern boundary with Washington is the Columbia River (the state line).

Adjacent counties

 Klickitat County, Washington - north
 Sherman County, Oregon - east
 Gilliam County, Oregon - east
 Wheeler County, Oregon - southeast
 Jefferson County, Oregon - south
 Marion County, Oregon - southwest
 Clackamas County, Oregon - west
 Hood River County, Oregon - west

National protected area
Mount Hood National Forest

Demographics

2000 census
At the 2000 census there were 23,791 people, 9,401 households, and 6,505 families living in the county.  The population density was 10 people per square mile (4/km2).  There were 10,651 housing units at an average density of 4 per square mile (2/km2).  The racial makeup of the county was 86.58% White, 3.81% Native American, 0.80% Asian, 0.50% Pacific Islander, 0.30% Black or African American, 5.65% from other races, and 2.36% from two or more races.  9.31% of the population were Hispanic or Latino of any race. 17.8% were of German, 11.8% English, 9.8% American, 9.5% Irish and 5.0% Norwegian ancestry.
Of the 9,401 households 30.20% had children under the age of 18 living with them, 54.80% were married couples living together, 9.90% had a female householder with no husband present, and 30.80% were non-families. 26.10% of households were one person and 11.50% were one person aged 65 or older.  The average household size was 2.47 and the average family size was 2.96.

The age distribution was 25.40% under the age of 18, 7.40% from 18 to 24, 25.20% from 25 to 44, 25.40% from 45 to 64, and 16.70% 65 or older.  The median age was 40 years. For every 100 females there were 97.90 males.  For every 100 females age 18 and over, there were 95.10 males.

The median household income was $35,959 and the median family income  was $42,412. Males had a median income of $36,051 versus $21,575 for females. The per capita income for the county was $17,195.  About 10.30% of families and 12.90% of the population were below the poverty line, including 17.70% of those under age 18 and 7.30% of those age 65 or over.

2010 census
At the 2010 census, there were 25,213 people, 10,031 households, and 6,540 families living in the county. The racial makeup of the county was 86.1% white, 4.4% American Indian, 0.8% Asian, 0.6% Pacific islander, 0.4% black or African American, 5.2% from other races, and 2.5% from two or more races. Those of Hispanic or Latino origin made up 14.8% of the population. In terms of ancestry, 19.8% were German, 14.0% were English, 10.6% were Irish, 6.4% were American, and 5.0% were Swedish.

Of the 10,031 households, 29.3% had children under the age of 18 living with them, 49.4% were married couples living together, 10.9% had a female householder with no husband present, 34.8% were non-families, and 28.8% of households were made up of individuals. The average household size was 2.44 and the average family size was 2.98. The median age was 41.7 years.

The median household income was $42,133 and the median family income was $50,279. Males had a median income of $40,658 versus $27,996 for females. The per capita income for the county was $21,922. About 11.1% of families and 15.5% of the population were below the poverty line, including 20.1% of those under age 18 and 7.6% of those age 65 or over.

Government and infrastructure
The Northern Oregon Regional Corrections Facility (Norcor), a short-term jail, serves Wasco, Gilliam, Hood River, and Sherman counties.

Politically, Wasco is a swing county. No presidential candidate has won more than 55% of the county's vote since Ronald Reagan in 1984, and none has won an absolute majority since Barack Obama in 2008. From 1972 to 2008, it voted for the election's national winner every time except the drought and farm crisis-influenced 1988 election; Obama lost here by just 18 votes or 0.2% of the popular vote in 2012.

Economy

The county's economy is based upon agriculture (orchards, wheat farming, livestock ranching), lumber, manufacturing, electric power, transportation, and tourism. Aluminum production was previously a major support of the local economy, but electrical price fluctuations and a slump in global aluminum prices has forced the closing of a number of local aluminum foundries.

Communities

Incorporated cities
Antelope, previously known as Rajneesh
Dufur
Maupin
Mosier
Shaniko
The Dalles (county seat)

Census-designated places
Chenoweth
Pine Grove
Pine Hollow
Rowena
Sportsmans Park
Tygh Valley
Wamic

Unincorporated communities

Bakeoven
Boyd 
Celilo Village
Criterion
Dant
Endersby
Fairbanks
Friend 
Kingsley
Nansene
Ortley
Rice
Simnasho
South Junction
Wapinitia

See also

National Register of Historic Places listings in Wasco County, Oregon
1984 Rajneeshee bioterror attack

References

Further reading
 Bruce Harris, The Wasco County History Book. The Dalles, OR: Bruce Harris, 1983.
 John Lundell, Governmental history of Wasco County, Oregon. n.c: n.p., 1970.
 William H. McNeal, History of Wasco County, Oregon. The Dalles, OR: William H. McNeal, 1953.
 Rodger Nichols and Dan Spatz, A Sesquicentennial History of Wasco County. The Dalles, OR: Dalles Chronicle, 2004.
 An Illustrated History of Central Oregon, Embracing Wasco, Sherman, Gilliam, Wheeler, Crook, Lake, and Klamath Counties, State of Oregon. Spokane, WA: Western Historical Publishing Co., 1905.

External links

Wasco County Home Page

 
Oregon placenames of Native American origin
1854 establishments in Oregon Territory
Columbia River Gorge
Rajneesh movement